Trond Håkon Trondsen (born 4 August 1994) is a Norwegian cyclist, who most recently rode for UCI Continental team .

Major results
2016
 1st Ringerike GP
 8th Overall Tour du Loir-et-Cher
2017
 4th Overall East Bohemia Tour
 5th Overall Baltic Chain Tour
 5th Road race, National Road Championships
2018
 1st Scandinavian Race Uppsala
 8th Overall Tour de Normandie
2019
 1st Sundvolden GP
 3rd Overall Tour de Normandie
1st Stage 6
2020
 1st Gylne Gutuer

References

External links

1994 births
Living people
Norwegian male cyclists
Sportspeople from Trondheim